Jadoo or Jaadoo may refer to:

 Jadoo (1951 film), the 1951 Hindi film
 Jadoo (2013 film), the 2013 British film
 Kedi (2006 film), the 2006 film released as Jadoo in Telugu
Jaadoo, hit debut album by Alisha Chinai 1985